Teresa Southwick (born California, United States) is an American author of contemporary and historical romance novels.

Biography 
Teresa Southwick was conceived in New Jersey, born in Southern California, and moved to Texas, where she lived for many years. She now resides with her husband and their two sons in Las Vegas, Nevada.

Southwick has been nominated three times for a Romantic Times Reviewers' Choice Award, winning in 2006 for In Good Company. She was also nominated in 2003 for a Romantic Times Career Achievement Award for series romance  and has been a finalist for the Romance Writers of America RITA Award, the highest award given to romance authors.

Bibliography

Novels 
 Reckless Destiny (1994)
 Reckless River (1994)
 Winter Bride (1995)
 Blackstone's Bride (1996)
 Wedding Rings and Baby Things (1997)
 The Bachelor's Baby (1997)
 The Way to a Cowboys Heart (1999)
 Secret Ingredient: Love (2001)
 Midnight, Moonlight and Miracles (2003)
 It Takes Three (2004)
 At the Millionaire's Request (2006)
 Winning Back His Bride (2006)
 Paging Dr. Daddy (2008)

Bundles of Joy Series Multi-Author 
 A Vow, a Ring, a Baby Swing (1999)

Marchetti Series 
 A Vow, a Ring, a Baby Swing (1999)
 And Then He Kissed Me (1999)
 With a Little T.L.C (2000)
 The Last Marchetti Bachelor (2001)

Storkville, U.S.A. Series Multi-Author 
 The Acquired Bride (2000)

Fortune's Heirs Series 
 Shotgun Vows (2001)

Destiny, Texas Series 
 Crazy for Lovin' You (2001)
 This Kiss (2001)
 If You Don't Know by Now (2001)
 What If We Fall in Love? (2002)

Coltons Series Multi-Author 
 Sky Full of Promise (2002)

Desert Brides Series Multi-Author 
 To Catch a Sheik (2003)
 To Kiss a Sheik (2003)
 To Wed a Sheik (2003)

If Wishes Were... Series 
 Baby, Oh Baby! (2004)
 Flirting with the Boss (2004)
 An Heiress on His Doorstep (2004)

Most Likely to... Series Multi-Author 
 The Beauty Queen's Makeover (2005)

Brides of Bella Lucia Series Multi-Author 
 Crazy about the Boss (2006)

Buy-A-Guy Series 
 That Touch Of Pink (2006)
 In Good Company (2006)
 Something's Gotta Give (2006)

Brothers of Bha'Khar Series 
 The Sheikh's Reluctant Bride (2007)
 The Sheikh's Contract Bride (2007)

Omnibus in collaboration 
 The Summer House (2002) (with Susan Mallery)
 Sky Full of Promise / The Wolf's Surrender (2003) (with Sandra Steffen)
 It Takes Three / Wedding Willies (2004) (with Victoria Pade)
 Beauty Queen's Makeover / Last Time I Saw Venice (2005) (with Vivienne Wallington)

See also 
 List of romantic novelists

References

External links 
Teresa Southwick at eHarlequin
Teresa Southwick at Mills & Boon

20th-century American novelists
21st-century American novelists
American romantic fiction writers
American women novelists
Living people
20th-century American women writers
21st-century American women writers
Year of birth missing (living people)